The Moment of Truth is the only studio album by pop group The Real Milli Vanilli, released in 1991.

History
The Moment of Truth was originally meant to be the follow-up to Milli Vanilli's debut album All or Nothing (repackaged as Girl You Know It's True in the United States). After it was revealed that Rob Pilatus and Fab Morvan had not performed the vocals they were credited with in Milli Vanilli, producer Frank Farian formed the group "The Real Milli Vanilli", featuring the actual singers on the recordings, as well as new vocalists Gina Mohammed and Ray Horton. Milli Vanilli vocalist Charles Shaw was unable to record for this album after being paid for his silence regarding his involvement with the first Milli Vanilli album. Most of the lead vocals on The Moment of Truth were performed by Brad Howell, who had performed many of the lead vocals on All or Nothing and Girl You Know It's True. The album also features rappers Icy Bro on "Hard as Hell" and Tammy T on "Too Late (True Love)".

The album's cover shows Brad Howell, Icy Bro, Ray Horton, Gina Mohammed and John Davis. The album's originally proposed title was Keep on Running, the title of the first single released from the album. Although The Moment of Truth appeared on its cover (and The 2nd Album at the bottom), Keep on Running still appeared on its spine.

The Moment of Truth was released only in Brazil, Europe, Asia and New Zealand, and reached the top 20 in Germany. The Real Milli Vanilli also released three singles, one of which ("Keep on Running") made it to number four on the German charts.

The Diane Warren-penned "When I Die" has been covered by several other artists, including Farian's own project No Mercy. It also appeared on the soundtrack of the Brazilian soap opera Lua Cheia de Amor in 1991 and received radio airplay in Brazil. Another Warren song, "Tell Me Where It Hurts", was covered by Christian singer Kathy Troccoli and released as a single in 1994.

Seven of the songs from The Moment of Truth were reworked and released under the name Try 'n' B on their self-titled debut album, with the addition of Tracy Ganser and Kevin Weatherspoon on vocals. The album contained three additional songs: "Ding Dong", "Who Do You Love", and a cover of Dr. Hook's "Sexy Eyes".

Track listing

Personnel

The Real Milli Vanilli
 John Davis – vocals, backing vocals
 Brad Howell – vocals
 Gina Mohammed – vocals
 Ray Horton – vocals
 Linda Rocco – vocals
 Jodie Rocco-Hafner – vocals

Additional personnel
 Joan Faulkner – backing vocals
 Frank Farian – backing vocals
 Franco Dittman – backing vocals
 P.G. Wylder – keyboards, arrangements, programming
 Marc Dalton – guitars
 Peter Welhe – guitars
 Ed DeGenaro – guitars
 Mike Wonder – programming
 Kerim Saka – programming
 Tobias Freund – programming, engineering
 Mel Collins – saxophone
 Dino Solera – horns
 Felice Civitareale – horns
 Claus Reichstaller – horns
 Curt Cress – drums
 Bernd Berwan – engineering
 Helmut Rulofs – engineering
 Michael Bestmann – engineering
 Norbert G. Yanicke – engineering
 Milli-Ingrid Segieth – production coordinator
 Frank Farian – producer
 Hans Wegner – cover design
 Helge Strauß, Manfred Esser – photography

Alternate release: Try 'n' B

In 1992, RCA signed on to rework and re-release the album as the debut of the newly created group Try 'n' B. Because this album received significantly better sales than The Moment of Truth in America, a slightly modified version was also released internationally.

Track listing
"Tell Me Where It Hurts" (Diane Warren) – 4:09
"Keep on Running" (Frank Farian, Franz Reuther, Chris Kindt) – 5:13
"Ding Dong" (Kerim Saka, Mike Wonder) – 3:48
"When I Die" (Frank Farian, Dietmar Kawohl, Peter Bischof-Fallenstein, Diane Warren) – 4:21
"Body Slam" (Frank Farian, Mike Wonder, Kerim Saka, Ralf Battle) – 3:23
"Sexy Eyes" (Chris Waters, Keith Stegall, R.J. Mather) – 4:04
"In My Life" (Clyde Lieberman, Jeff Pescetto, Richard James Burgess) – 4:07
"The End of Good Times" (Frank Farian, P.G. Wylder, Mary Susan Applegate) – 4:18
"Nice 'n' Easy" (Frank Farian, P.G. Wylder, Robert Rayen, Diane Warren) – 4:08
"Who Do You Love" (John Davis) – 5:22

Personnel
Frank Farian for MCI – producer
Recorded and mixed at Farian Studios/Far Studios
P.G. Wylder – keyboards
Marc Dalton, Peter Weihe – guitar
P.G. Wylder, M. Wonder, K. Saha – arrangements
P.G. Wylder, Mike Wonder, Kerim Saka, Tobias Freund – programming
Mel Collins – saxophone
Dino Solera, Felice Civitareale, Claus Reichstaller – horns
Tobias Freund, Bernd Berwanger, Todd Canedy, Helmut Rulofs, Michael Bestmann, Norbert G. *Yanicke – engineering
Milli-Ingrid Segieth – production coordination
Mike Schraft – photos
Jacqueline Murphy – logo design

Certifications

References

Milli Vanilli albums
1991 debut albums
Albums produced by Frank Farian
Hansa Records albums